The 1939 Washington University Bears football team was an American football team that represented Washington University in St. Louis as a member of the Missouri Valley Conference (MVC) during the 1939 college football season. In its eighth season under head coach Jimmy Conzelman, the team compiled a 6–3–1 record (4–1 against MVC opponents) and outscored opponents by a total of 172 to 103. The team played its home games at Francis Field in St. Louis.

Schedule

References

Washington University
Washington University Bears football seasons
Missouri Valley Conference football champion seasons
Washington University Bears football